Mechanical Horizon is the seventh album by electro-industrial duo Decoded Feedback, the fifth full-length CD, and the first released on Germany's Bloodline record label. The album peaked at #36 on the CMJ RPM Charts in the U.S.

Track listing
 "Reflect in Silence" – 6:35
 "Atlantis" – 5:28
 "Celestia" – 5:57
 "Dark-Star" – 4:46
 "Immortal" – 4:57
 "A Kill to an End" – 5:57
 "Existence" – 5:12
 "The Sequel (Cover Version)" – 2:34
 "Desire" – 5:45
 "Mechanical Horizon" – 5:22
 "Fear 2000" – 3:21

Personnel
 Marco Biagiotti
 Yone Dudas

References

2000 albums
Decoded Feedback albums